Trosnyansky District is an administrative and municipal district (raion), one of the twenty-four in Oryol Oblast, Russia. It is located in the southwest of the oblast. Its administrative center is the rural locality (a selo) of Trosna. Population: 10,302 (2010 Census);  The population of Trosna accounts for 24.6% of the district's total population.

References

Notes

Sources

Districts of Oryol Oblast